Pseudoradiarctia affinis is a moth in the family Erebidae. It was described by Max Bartel in 1903. It is found in Ghana, Sierra Leone and Tanzania.

References

Moths described in 1903
Spilosomina